Sahir is a given name. Notable people with the name include:

 Sahir Edoo (born 1987), Mauritian badminton player
 Sahir Hoshiarpuri (1913–1994), Urdu poet
 Sahir Lodhi, Pakistani actor, director, and host
 Sahir Ludhianvi (died 1980), Urdu poet
 Sahir Naqash (born 1990), German cricketer

Arabic masculine given names